The  governor of North Carolina from 1712 to 1776 was the representative of the British monarch in North Carolina. From 1729 to 1776, he was appointed by the monarch on the advice of the secretary of state for the Southern Department and the Board of Trade. The role of the governor was to act as the de facto head of state, and he was responsible for appointing members of the provincial government after a general election. The governor served as the commander in chief of the provincial militia and had sole responsibility for defence and security.

Besides the governor, other provincial officials included a secretary, attorney general, surveyor general, the receiver general, chief justice, five customs collectors for each of the five ports in North Carolina, and a council. The council advised the governor and also served as the upper house of the legislature. The president of the council occasionally served as acting governor.

List of  governors of North Carolina (1712–1776)

References

External links

 

 
1712 establishments in the British Empire
1776 disestablishments in North Carolina
Province of North-Carolina